Mbeya  is a district of Mbeya Region, Tanzania and comprises the area of Mbeya town.  It is bordered to the north by Mbeya Rural District, to the east by Rungwe District, to the south by Ileje District and to the west by Mbozi District.

According to the 2012 Tanzania National Census, the population of Mbeya Urban District was 385,479.

Wards
Mbeya Urban District is administratively divided into 36 wards:

 Forest
 Ghana
 Iduda
 Iganjo
 Iganzo
 Igawilo
 Ilemi
 Ilomba
 Isanga
 Isyesye
 Itagano
 Itende
 Itezi
 Itiji
 Iwambi
 Iyela
 Iyunga
 Iziwa
 Kalobe
 Maanga
 Mabatini
 Maendeleo 
 Majengo
 Mbalizi Road
 Mwakibete
 Mwansekwa
 Mwansanga
 Nonde
 Nsalaga
 Nsoho
 Nzovwe
 Ruanda
 Sinde
 Sisimba
 Tembela
 Uyole

References

Districts of Mbeya Region